is a Japanese science fiction film directed by Daihachi Yoshida and based on the 1962 novel of the same name by Yukio Mishima.

Plot
The Osugi family consists of the father Jūichirō Osugi (Lily Franky), mother Iyoko (Tomoko Nakajima), son Kazuo (Kazuya Kamenashi) and daughter Akiko (Ai Hashimoto). Over the course of the film, the father comes to believe that he is from Mars, the son that he is from Mercury and the daughter from Venus. Jūichirō works as a weather forecaster, Iyoko joins a pyramid scheme selling water, Kazuo is a bike messenger and Akiko is a college student with a complex about her beauty.

The family struggle, often in conflict, to address the threat of global warming.

Cast
 Lily Franky as Jūichirō Ōsugi
 Kazuya Kamenashi as Kazuo Ōsugi
 Ai Hashimoto as Akiko Ōsugi
 Tomoko Nakajima as Iyoko Ōsugi
 Kuranosuke Sasaki as Katsumi Kuroki
 Yūichi Haba
 Yurie Midori
 Junichi Haruta
 Ryuya Wakaba
 Asuka Hinoi

Awards

References

External links
 

2017 films
2010s science fiction drama films
Japanese science fiction drama films
Films directed by Daihachi Yoshida
Films based on works by Yukio Mishima
2010s Japanese films
2010s Japanese-language films